The Social Democratic Youth (TSD) is the youth organisation of the Social Democratic Party (PSD) of Romania.

External links
 Official homepage of Tineretul Social Democrat

References

Social Democratic Party (Romania)
Youth wings of political parties in Romania
Youth wings of social democratic parties